Neil Faulkner may refer to: 

 Neil Faulkner (archaeologist) (1958–2022), British archaeologist
 Neil Faulkner (painter) (born 1962), British painter

See also 
 Faulkner (surname)